Erin Pearl (born May 3, 1982 in Scarborough, Maine) is an American former competitive figure skater. She won two bronze medals at the ISU Junior Grand Prix in Slovakia (1997, 1998) and two junior medals at the U.S. Championships (silver in 1997, bronze in 1998). In 1999, she competed at the inaugural Four Continents Championships, finishing 4th.

Pearl was coached by Richard Callaghan, Mitch Moyer, and Debra Coppinger in Rochester Hills, Michigan. In 2000, she retired from competition due to an injury.

Results
JGP: ISU Junior Series / ISU Junior Grand Prix

References

American female single skaters
1982 births
Living people
People from Scarborough, Maine
Sportspeople from Maine
21st-century American women
20th-century American women